Timeline of solar astronomy

9th century
 850 — Ahmad ibn Muhammad ibn Kathīr al-Farghānī (Alfraganus) gives values for the obliquity of the ecliptic, the precessional movement of the apogees of the Sun

10th century
 900–929 — Muhammad ibn Jābir al-Harrānī al-Battānī (Albatenius) discovers that the direction of the Sun's eccentricity is changing
 950–1000 — Ibn Yunus observes more than 10,000 entries for the Sun's position for many years using a large astrolabe with a diameter of nearly 1.4 metres

11th century
 1031 — Abū al-Rayhān al-Bīrūnī calculates the distance between the Earth and the Sun in his Canon Mas’udicus

17th century
 1613 — Galileo Galilei uses sunspot observations to demonstrate the rotation of the Sun
 1619 — Johannes Kepler postulates a solar wind to explain the direction of comet tails

19th century
 1802 — William Hyde Wollaston observes dark lines in the solar spectrum
 1814 — Joseph Fraunhofer systematically studies the dark lines in the solar spectrum
 1834 — Hermann Helmholtz proposes gravitational contraction as the energy source for the Sun
 1843 — Heinrich Schwabe announces his discovery of the sunspot cycle and estimates its period to be about a decade
 1852 — Edward Sabine shows that sunspot number is correlated with geomagnetic field variations
 1859 — Richard Carrington discovers solar flares
 1860 — Gustav Kirchhoff and Robert Bunsen discover that each chemical element has its own distinct set of spectral lines
 1861 — Gustav Spörer discovers the variation of sun-spot latitudes during a solar cycle, explained by Spörer's law
 1863 — Richard Carrington discovers the differential nature of solar rotation
 1868 — Pierre Janssen and Norman Lockyer discover an unidentified yellow line in solar prominence spectra and suggest it comes from a new element which they name "helium"
 1893 — Edward Maunder discovers the 1645-1715 Maunder sunspot minimum

20th century
 1904 — Edward Maunder plots the first sunspot "butterfly diagram"
 1906 — Karl Schwarzschild explains solar limb darkening
 1908 — George Hale discovers the Zeeman splitting of spectral lines from sunspots
 1925 — Cecilia Payne proposes hydrogen is the dominant element of the Sun, not iron
 1929 — Bernard Lyot invents the coronagraph and observes the corona with an "artificial eclipse"
 1942 — J.S. Hey detects solar radio waves
 1949 — Herbert Friedman detects solar X-rays
 1960 — Robert B. Leighton, Robert Noyes, and George Simon discover solar five-minute oscillations by observing the Doppler shifts of solar dark lines
 1961 — Horace W. Babcock proposes the magnetic coiling sunspot theory
 1970 — Roger Ulrich, John Leibacher, and Robert F. Stein deduce from theoretical solar models that the interior of the Sun could act as a resonant acoustic cavity
 1975 — Franz-Ludwig Deubner makes the first accurate measurements of the period and horizontal wavelength of the five-minute solar oscillations
 1981 — NASA retrieves data from 1978 that shows a comet crashing into the Sun

21st century
 2004 — largest solar flare ever recorded occurs

Solar Astronomy, Timeline of